The School of Advanced Study (SAS), a postgraduate institution of the University of London, is the UK's national centre for the promotion and facilitation of research in the humanities and social sciences. It was established in 1994 and is based in Senate House, in Bloomsbury, central London, close to the British Museum, British Library and several of the colleges of the University of London. The School brings together nine research institutes, many of which have long histories, to provide a wide range of specialist research services, facilities and resources. It offers taught master's and research degrees in humanities and social science subjects (MA, MRes, LLM, MPhil, and PhD).

History
The School was established on 1 August 1994. Its nine institutes range in age; the oldest, the Institute of Historical Research, was founded in 1921; the youngest, the Institute of Philosophy, was founded in 2005.

Location
The School is in Senate House, the administrative centre of the University of London, in Bloomsbury, central London.

Organisation and structure

The Member Institutes of the School are:

Institute of Advanced Legal Studies
Institute of Classical Studies
Institute of Commonwealth Studies
Institute of English Studies
Institute of Modern Languages Research (including the Centre for Latin American and Caribbean Studies)
Institute of Historical Research
Institute of Philosophy
Warburg Institute

The Institutes of the School provide a range of specialist research services in their subject areas of expertise. In furtherance of their national and international role, the Institutes of the School undertake high-quality research; maintain and develop library collections and services; develop digital resources; publish journals and book series; host visiting scholars and postdoctoral fellows; organise a range of academic events including workshops, conferences, seminars and lectures; provide specialist research training and postgraduate taught, research, and doctoral programmes.

Publishing 
The University of London Press (also known as UoL Press) is based in the School of Advanced Study. Founded in 1910, it was relaunched in 2019 as a fully open access publisher specializing in "distinctive scholarship at the forefront of the Humanities".

Deans 
Notable deans of the school include:

 Roderick Floud – 2007 to 2009
 Roger Kain – 2010 to 2017
 Rick Rylance – 2017 to 2020
 Jo Fox – since December 2020

References

External links

University of London website

 
University of London
Educational institutions established in 1994
1994 establishments in England
Humanities institutes